Daniel Freitas may refer to:
 Daniel Freitas (boxer), Uruguayan boxer
 Daniel Freitas (cyclist), Portuguese cyclist

See also
 Daniel Correa Freitas, Brazilian footballer